Sergeant George J. Pitman (1839 – April 30, 1884) was an American soldier who fought in the American Civil War. Pitman received his country's highest award for bravery during combat, the Medal of Honor. Pitman's medal was won for his capturing of George M Patterson's Battery flag of the 11th Battalion, Georgia Artillery (Sumter's Artillery) at the conclusion of the Battle of Sailor's Creek on April 6, 1865. Pitman was one of three members of the 1st New York (Lincoln) Cavalry who rode to the flag bearers of a Georgia regiment and demanded their flags. He was honored with the award on May 3, 1865.

Pitman was born in Recklestown in New Jersey, and entered service in Philadelphia in Pennsylvania, where he was buried.

Medal of Honor citation

See also
List of American Civil War Medal of Honor recipients: M–P

References

1839 births
1884 deaths
American Civil War recipients of the Medal of Honor
People from New Jersey
People of New Jersey in the American Civil War
Union Army soldiers
United States Army Medal of Honor recipients